The Slavic Cup is a rugby league football competition first competed for in 2006.  The first winners of the Slavic Cup were Serbia.  The competition was organized as part of the continuing effort to spread the game of rugby league throughout the many nations of Europe.  In 2007, Slavic Cup match was played as a part of European Shield tournament, in which the both holders Serbia and Czech Republic are taking part, with Serbia defended the Cup. 2008 saw new format of Slavic Cup, with both nations capital selections taking on each other in one match held in Prague.

Past results

See also

References

External links

European rugby league competitions
Rugby league in Serbia
Rugby league international tournaments
Rugby league in Europe